Stuart MacGregor (born 26 June 1998 in York) is an English professional squash player. As of August 2021, he was ranked number 191 in the world.

References

1998 births
Living people
English male squash players